Prunus javanica is a species of plant in the family Rosaceae. It is found in India, Indonesia, Malaysia, and Myanmar.

References

javanica
Least concern plants
Taxonomy articles created by Polbot